Joseph A. Maynard (1875-1938) was an American political figure who served as chairman of the Massachusetts Democratic Party and Collector of Customs for the Port of Boston.

Early life and political activity
Maynard was born on January 1, 1875, in Boston. He entered the business world a young age. He worked as a manufacturer of plumbing supplies and was a director of the F.W. Webb Company, Fidelity Trust Company, Hibernia Savings Bank, and the McAuliffe Company.

Once he reached voting age, Maynard joined the Hendricks Club, where was a lieutenant of Martin Lomasney.

In 1902, Maynard was elected to the Boston Common Council.

On June 22, 1913, Maynard married Grace Earle Moore in Lawrence, Massachusetts.

Democratic Party politics

City chairman
From 1910 to 1914, Maynard, backed by Lomasney, James Michael Curley, and John F. Fitzgerald, served as president of the Boston Democratic Committee.

State chairman
On July 14, 1932, Maynard was elected chairman of the Massachusetts Democratic Party. He defeated acting chairman Charles D. Riordon 74 votes to 30. During his tenure as chairman, Maynard worked to build the party by reconciling the disputes between its different factions. He was forced to resign this position on September 30, 1934, after the Treasury Department ruled that its officers could not hold the position of state party chairman or national committeeman.

Customs

Surveyor
From 1913 to 1921, Maynard served as surveyor for the Port of Boston. Appointed at the age of 38, he was the youngest person to hold this position.

Collector
In 1933, Maynard was appointed Collector of Customs for the Port of Boston by his close, personal friend Franklin D. Roosevelt. He was reappointed by Roosevelt in 1937.

In addition to his duties as Collector, Maynard was also a trustee of the Norfolk County Agricultural School from 1934 to 1938.

Death
On January 7, 1938, Maynard suffered a heart attack at the Boston Custom House. Maynard was able to walk to his car and was being driven home by his chauffeur when the attack became worse. Deputy Collector Owen McKenna, who was accompanying Maynard, stopped to consult a doctor. Maynard, however, was too ill to leave the car and the doctor decided to follow Maynard in his car and treat Maynard at home. Maynard lost consciousness in the car and could not be revived. He was pronounced dead at his home in Brookline, Massachusetts. The official cause of death was Angina pectoris.

References

1875 births
1938 deaths
Boston City Council members
Massachusetts Democratic Party chairs
Politicians from Brookline, Massachusetts
Collectors of the Port of Boston